Branko Filip (born 18 March 1975) is a former Slovenian cyclist he is current coach of the men's cycling team Torku Şekerspor of Turkey.

He also coached men's cycling team of Qatar between 2012-2016.

Palmares
1998
1st Tour of Slovenia
1999
1st  National Time Trial Championships

References

1975 births
Living people
Slovenian male cyclists
Slovenian cycling coaches